USS Arlington (LPD-24), a , is the third ship of the United States Navy to be named for Arlington, Virginia, the location of the Pentagon and the crash site of American Airlines Flight 77 during the terrorist attacks on 11 September 2001. Steel taken from the Pentagon after the attacks is displayed aboard in the ship's museum.

Construction
Arlingtons keel was laid down on 26 May 2008, at Northrop Grumman's Ingalls shipyard in Pascagoula, Mississippi. Builder's Trials of the ship started on 21 August 2012. These were completed on 30 August 2012. She completed Navy acceptance sea trials on 2 November 2012. The US Navy formally accepted the ship on 7 December 2012. Arlington arrived at her homeport of Naval Station Norfolk, Virginia on 22 March 2013 in preparation for commissioning. Officially, she was commissioned on 8 February 2013, but her ceremonial commissioning occurred on 6 April 2013 at Naval Station Norfolk. Originally scheduled as the third ship of the San Antonio class, she was the eighth to be commissioned. Mrs. Joyce Rumsfeld, wife of former United States Secretary of Defense Donald Rumsfeld, is the ship's sponsor.

Operational history

In August 2013, Arlington conducted trials with NASA's Orion spacecraft. In May 2019 she was deployed to the Persian Gulf due to reported concerns about Iranian activities. In April 2022 Arlington was deployed to Icelandic waters to take part in the NATO exercise Northern Viking 2022.

References

External links 

Official USS Arlington (LPD-24) website

 

San Antonio-class amphibious transport docks
Ships built in Pascagoula, Mississippi
2010 ships
Ships of the United States Navy